Odem-Edroy Independent School District is a public school district based in Odem, Texas (USA).

In addition to Odem, the district serves the community of Edroy.

Odem-Edroy ISD has four campuses - Odem High School (Grades 9–12), Odem Junior High (Grades 6–8), Odem Intermediate (Grades 3–5), and Odem Elementary (PK-2).

In 2009, the school district was rated "academically acceptable" by the Texas Education Agency.

References 

2. http://www.oeisd.org/technology/techplan.pdf  Technology Plan

External links
 

School districts in San Patricio County, Texas